Crawford College, North Coast schoolalternative, independent school between Ballito and Umdloti on the North Coast of KwaZulu-Natal, South Africa. The school is owned by the ADvTECH Group and is run as a for-profit business enterprise.

Crawford College, North Coast was founded in 1997 on the campus of uThongathi School by Graeme Crawford. The school comprises pre-primary, preparatory and a college.

References

External links

1997 establishments in South Africa
Boarding schools in South Africa
Educational institutions established in 1997
Private schools in KwaZulu-Natal